Cedar Rapids River Raiders are a former professional basketball team based in Cedar Rapids, Iowa.  They were a part of the United States Basketball League.  The organization was founded in 2003 and existed for one season (2004). They played their home games at U.S. Cellular Center.

See also
Cedar Rapids Silver Bullets

References 

United States Basketball League teams
Sports in Cedar Rapids, Iowa
2003 establishments in Iowa
2004 disestablishments in Iowa
Basketball teams in Iowa
Basketball teams established in 2003
Sports clubs disestablished in 2004